Walter Warren Wagar (June 5, 1932 Baltimore, Maryland – November 16, 2004 Vestal, New York), better known as W. Warren Wagar, was an American  historian and futures studies scholar.

Life 

A specialist in alternative society futures and an expert in the work of pioneering science fiction writer H.G. Wells, Wagar served as history professor at Binghamton University, State University of New York, for 31 years, after graduating from Yale University. His courses on the history of the future and World War III earned him the title of Distinguished Teaching Professor at Binghamton.

Wagar began writing science fiction in 1984, publishing nine stories in various magazines and anthologies. He wrote four articles for The Futurist, contributed to a discussion on terrorism in the January–February 2002 issue, served on the editorial board for Futures Research Quarterly, and spoke at several World Future Society conferences.

Wagar published 18 books.

Work on H. G. Wells 

Wagar's work on H. G. Wells began with his doctoral dissertation, which was published as H. G. Wells and the World State (1961), a study of Wells's political philosophy. He subsequently collected a volume of Wells essays and extracts in H. G. Wells: Journalism and Prophecy (1963), edited a critical edition of Wells's The Open Conspiracy (2001) and finally published H.G. Wells: Traversing Time, which traces Wells’s philosophies on utopia, war, romance, education, and modernism, focusing on his nonfiction and general fiction as well as his science fiction. For these, and many essays on Wells in such scholarly journals as Science Fiction Studies and The Wellsian, Wagar was made a vice-president of the H. G. Wells Society.

Single works

The City of Man 

The City of Man (1963) sees the imminent collapse of world civilization, which he regarded as an excellent opportunity: "There is no more opportune moment for radical change than in the aftermath of a world catastrophe".

A Short History of the Future 

In A Short History of the Future (1989), a narrative account of the imagined events of the next 200 years, Wagar foresaw the Soviet Union enjoying another 200 years of existence. In the second edition of the book he ruefully recounted how the first edition had only just gone to press when the Soviet Union collapsed.

Quote

Editions 

 (Entry at World Cat)
 

 (Entry at World Cat)

Literature

References

External links
 Photographs of Wagar and his family

See also 
 The H. G. Wells Society

1932 births
2004 deaths
Writers from Baltimore
20th-century American historians
American male non-fiction writers
Binghamton University faculty
American futurologists
State University of New York faculty
Historians from Maryland
20th-century American male writers